Jack Douglas (2 June 1929 – 6 February 2007) was an  Australian rules footballer who played with Hawthorn in the Victorian Football League (VFL).

Notes

External links 

1929 births
2007 deaths
Australian rules footballers from the Australian Capital Territory
Hawthorn Football Club players